Madeleine Angevine is a white wine grape from the Loire Valley in France that is also popular in Germany, Kyrgyzstan and Washington state. The early-ripening grape is a cross between Madeleine Royale and Malingre Précoce grapes that grows well in cooler climates. Madeleine Angevine makes an attractive fruity wine with a flowery nose, similar to an Alsatian Pinot blanc. It is crisp, acid and dry and pairs particularly well with seafoods such as crab and oyster.

Madeleine Angevine was crossed with Silvaner Geilweilerhof to make the Noblessa and Forta grapes. It was crossed with Traminer to make the Comtessa grape.

In Washington State, the grape has developed a cult following in the Puget Sound region for its floral character and easy-drinking nature.

Madeleine x Angevine 7672 / Sämling 7672
The variety called ‘Madeleine Angevine’ in the UK is more properly called Madeleine x Angevine 7672. In 1957 Ray Brock at Oxted was sent cuttings of several varieties by Dr. Zimmerman from Alzey and one of them was labelled ‘Sämling [seedling] 7672’. Just when this crossing was made is not known, although the timing would suggest that it was while Georg Scheu – responsible for varieties such as Huxelrebe, Faberrebe, Kanzler, Regner, Scheurebe, Septimer, Siegerrebe and Würzer – was the Alzey Institute's Director. By 1960 Brock was able to report that it was giving large crops which ripen with Riesling Sylvaner [MT]. Considered to be a promising variety. Not having been given the crossing details of Sämling 7672, Brock wrote to Zimmerman and asked for them. He was informed that it was a ‘freely pollinated seedling of Madeleine Angevine’. When Brock started to sell cuttings of the variety (as he did with all promising varieties) he gave it the name Madeleine x Angevine 7672 and it was under this name that it was known for many years. As it became quite popular, the name on wine labels became shortened to simply ‘Madeleine Angevine’. This was an unfortunate name as another variety already existed under this name.
The true Madeleine Angevine (also sometimes called Madeleine d’Angevine), is a female-only table-grape variety, a crossing of Précoce de Malingre and Madeleine Royale  made by Pierre Vibert at the Moreau-Robert nurseries in Angers in 1857 (some reports say 1859). It is one of the earliest table-grape varieties for open cultivation in France. Having only female flowers and being very early, it has been used by plant breeders in a number of crosses over the years. Morio and Husfeld used it for Forta and Noblessa and it is one grandparent of Reichensteiner. Scheu himself used it to produce Siegerrebe, and this variety, which at one time was credited with being a Madeleine Angevine x Gewürztraminer crossing, was unmasked by Heinz Scheu – Georg's son – as also being a freely pollinated Madeleine Angevine seedling. It is conceivable that the variety we now grow in the UK as Madeleine x Angevine 7672 comes from the same crossing programme that produced Siegerrebe. In 1992, I asked Professor Dr. Alleweldt, then head of the Geilweilerhof State Institute for Grapevine Breeding, to see if he could discover more about our Mad Angie (as it is often known). He located Georg Scheu's old breeding books in the Alzey archives and found that ‘Sämling 7672’ was – as Brock was originally told – an ‘open-pollinated progeny of Madeleine Angevine’.

Madeleine x Angevine 7672 found favour with many of the early UK growers and it became fairly widespread. At one time it was the third most popular variety (after MT and Seyval blanc) and Gillian Pearkes, in the West Country, thought highly of it. Unfortunately, owing to the confusion over the name and the fact that this variety was not available from any other source other than Brock's original stock or vineyards planted with vines obtained from Brock, some growers were sold vines of the true table grape variety Madeleine Angevine, which was barely suitable for the UK, except in the very best years. Unless it was being grown in proximity to other early varieties for pollination, it seldom set a good crop and in some years, ripened at the end of August. The wines from this table grape variety were flabby and never really acceptable, except for blending. The confusion over this variety – foreseen in a rare moment of sanity (as far as rules and regulations governing UK viticulture is concerned) by the EU Commission in 1973 when MAFF submitted vine varieties for classification – has meant that it gained something of a chequered reputation.

Today, the area planted is 46.8-hectares and under 4 per cent of the UK's planted area – down from 54.6-hectares in 1990, but not drastically so. Its supporters like it: it ripens early, gives good crops and the wines have a light Muscat tone. It has a low acidity (usually a blessing) and is easy to grow.  It ripens in the Puget Sound AVA approx. 3rd week September, our annual GDD-50 averages 2,000.

Synonyms 

Madeleine Angevine is also known under the synonyms Azhupskaja Mladenka, Chasselas de Talhouet, Juliusi Magdolna, Korai Magda, Maddalena Angevina, Madelaine Angevine, Madlen Angevine, Madlen Anzevin, Madlen Anzhevin, Madlen Anzhuiskaya, Madlenka Rana, Magdalene Angevine, Magdalenka Skora, Magdalina Anzhuiskaya, Margitszoeloe, Petrovskii, and Republician.

References

External links
Madeleine Angevine 7672 winegrowers.info
Wine 101 - Madeleine Angevine winecompass.blogspot.com

White wine grape varieties